Takumi Fujiwara may refer to:

 Takumi Fujiwara (sailor), Japanese sailor
 Takumi Fujiwara, the lead character of the manga series Initial D